Augusto Matías Fernández (born 10 April 1986) is an Argentine former professional footballer who played as a central midfielder.

Club career

River Plate
Born in Pergamino, Buenos Aires, Fernández was a River Plate youth graduate. He made his first team debut on 29 January 2006, coming on as a substitute for Jonathan Santana in a 5–0 away routing of Tiro Federal.

Fernández scored his first professional goal on 8 April 2007, netting the equalizer in a 1–1 home draw against Belgrano. With River he won the 2008 Clausura under Diego Simeone's coaching, playing on 15 of the 19 games (9 starts).

Saint-Etienne
On 28 August 2009, after fellow Argentine Gonzalo Bergessio joined AS Saint-Étienne, Fernández arrived to the aforementioned French club. He was loaned to the French club by a third-party owner of his rights, Israeli businessman Pinhas Zahavi.

Fernández made his Ligue 1 debut on 13 September 2009, starting in a 0–1 loss at Stade Rennais, and scored his first goal in the category roughly a month later in a 3–1 home win against FC Girondins de Bordeaux. However, he only appeared in 12 matches during the campaign, as his side narrowly avoided relegation.

Vélez Sarsfield
On 9 July 2010, Fernández signed a three-year deal with Argentine Primera División side Vélez Sarsfield, who bought 100% of his rights from Pinhas Zahavi for a fee of US$1.5 million. In his first tournament with his new club, the 2010 Apertura, he played 12 games (all as a starter) on Vélez' runner-up campaign.

Fernández totalled 17 games (over 19) and 4 goals in his team's 2011 Clausura-winning campaign, and 10 games (over 12) and 4 goals in their Copa Libertadores semi-finalist campaign. During the semester, he scored in 57 days twice as many goals as he had during his entire professional career: 3 in the Copa Libertadores and another 3 in the Argentine league. Against L.D.U. Quito in the Copa Libertadores round of 16, he also scored his first double.

Celta
On 8 August 2012, Fernández joined newly promoted La Liga club Celta de Vigo on a four-year deal. He made his debut in the category ten days later, starting in a 0–1 home loss against Málaga CF.

Fernández scored his first goal in the main category of Spanish football on 22 September 2012, netting the first in a 2–1 home success over Getafe CF. He finished the season as an ever-present figure for the Galicians, appearing in 36 matches and scoring six goals as his side narrowly avoided relegation.

Fernández was still a first-choice in the following campaigns, with the side now finishing in mid-table positions. On 3 October 2014, he was appointed captain of the club, replacing Borja Oubiña.

Atlético Madrid
On 1 January 2016, Fernández joined Atlético Madrid on a three-year deal for an undisclosed fee, mainly as a cover to the injured Tiago. He made his debut 5 days later, playing 57 minutes of a Copa del Rey draw away to Rayo Vallecano before being replaced by Luciano Vietto; he made his first league appearance for the club on the 11th of January, against Celta, his former team. Later, he started in the 2016 Champions League final, although he was substituted off at half-time. He only made 8 appearances in the following seasons with the Rojiblancos.

Beijing Renhe
On 31 January 2018, Fernández signed with Chinese Super League club Beijing Renhe on an undisclosed fee.

Cádiz
On 23 June 2020, Fernández returned to Spain and joined Segunda División side Cádiz CF for the remainder of the season. He signed an extension for the following season later, with the club achieving promotion to the La Liga. On 21 May 2021, after securing first division football for the upcoming season, Fernández announced his retirement from football.

International career
Fernández made his full international debut for Argentina on 15 September 2011, starting in a 0–0 Superclásico de las Américas home draw against Brazil. On 2 June 2014 he was included in Alejandro Sabella's final 23-man squad for the year's FIFA World Cup, but was only an unused substitute during the whole tournament. In May 2016, he was included in Gerardo Martino's 23-man Argentina squad for the Copa América Centenario, being a starter for most of the tournament before missing the final after getting injured in the semifinal match.

Club statistics

International

International goals

Honours

Club
River Plate
Argentine Primera División: 2008 Clausura

Vélez Sársfield
Argentine Primera División: 2011 Clausura

Atletico Madrid
UEFA Champions League runner-up: 2015–16

International
Argentina
FIFA World Cup runner-up: 2014
Copa América runner-up: 2016

References

External links

 
 
 
 
  

1986 births
Living people
People from Pergamino
Argentine people of Spanish descent
Argentine footballers
Association football midfielders
Argentine Primera División players
Ligue 1 players
La Liga players
Segunda División players
Chinese Super League players
Club Atlético River Plate footballers
Club Atlético Vélez Sarsfield footballers
AS Saint-Étienne players
RC Celta de Vigo players
Atlético Madrid footballers
Beijing Renhe F.C. players
Cádiz CF players
2014 FIFA World Cup players
Copa América Centenario players
Argentina international footballers
Argentine expatriate footballers
Argentine expatriate sportspeople in France
Argentine expatriate sportspeople in Spain
Expatriate footballers in France
Expatriate footballers in Spain
Expatriate footballers in China
Sportspeople from Buenos Aires Province